Rupinder Pal Singh (born 11 November 1990) is a professional field hockey player, who represents India in the Indian Hockey Team. He plays as a fullback and is known for his abilities as one of the best drag flickers in the world. He represented India in the 2014 Commonwealth Games at Glasgow, 2014 Asian Games at Incheon, 2016 Olympic Games held at Rio de Janeiro, and at the 2018 Commonwealth Games, held at Gold Coast, Australia. He was part of the Indian hockey team that won a Bronze medal at the 2020 Olympic Games in Tokyo.

Early life 
Rupinder Pal Singh was born in a Sikh family in Faridkot, Punjab, India. The six-foot four inch-footer, is the youngest of the family, who took up hockey at the age of eleven. He is related to international hockey player, Gagan Ajit Singh. His interest in hockey got a boost when got selected for the Chandigarh Hockey Academy.

Career
Singh's international debut was in May 2010 in Sultan Azlan Shah Cup in Ipoh. His side went on to win the 2010 Sultan Azlan Shah Cup. The following year, Rupinder scored his first international Hat-trick against Great Britain in the 2011 Sultan Azlan Shah Cup. In the same tournament, Singh won the Top-scorer Award and was named in the Sultan Azlan Shah XI Team. At the 2014 Men's Hockey World Cup, Rupinder was named as the team's Vice-captain. He came out of retirement in May 2022 and was supposed to lead Indian team in Asia cup starting on May 23 in Jakarta, Indonesia but will not as he is ruled out of the tournament due to a wrist injury. Birendra Lakra, earlier named as vice-captain, will now lead men in blue alongside SV Sunil as new vice-captain of the team.

Hockey India League
Rupinder was bought by the Delhi franchise for a hefty sum. The Delhi team was named Delhi Waveriders. During an interview, Rupinder was quoted saying "I was surprised when the Delhi side picked me up for such a huge amount, but the tournament gave me a good platform to hone my skills, spending time with players like Sardar Singh and Nicolas Jacobi made me improve my game a lot and it showed in my performance, Even though we lost to Ranchi in the final, the team had a good run in the tournament". He proved his worth, scoring seven goals for the team, which finished second in the league. In the 2nd season, Rupinder's side won the 2014 Hockey India League, with Singh scoring 7 goals. Rupinder was declared the Player of the Tournament at the 2016 Hockey India League, and due to his significant contributions, Delhi Waveriders went on to secure the 3rd position at the HIL that year. In 2017, he captained the Delhi Waveriders, taking the team to the semi-final stage.
Rupinder has been regularly playing for Indian Overseas Bank (Chennai based Indian Bank) for many years.

Career achievements
 2010 Sultan Azlan Shah Cup, India won the Gold
 2011 Sultan Azlan Shah Cup, won Top-scorer Award, named in Sultan Azlan Shah's XI
 2011 Asian Men's Hockey Champions Trophy, India won the Gold
 2011 Men's Hockey Champions Challenge I, India won the Silver
 2012 Sultan Azlan Shah Cup, India won the Bronze
 2012 Men's Hockey Champions Trophy, India stood 4th
 2012 Asian Men's Hockey Champions Trophy, India won the Silver
 2012–13 Men's FIH Hockey World League Round 2, scored 7 goals
 2013 Sultan Azlan Shah Cup, won Top-scorer Award
 2013 Men's Hockey Asia Cup, India won Silver, scored 6 goals
 2014 Men's Hockey World Cup
 2014 Commonwealth Games, India won the Silver
 2014 Asian Games, held in Incheon, India won Gold
 2014 Men's Hockey Champions Trophy, India stood 4th
 2014-15 Men's FIH Hockey World League, India won the Bronze
 2016 Asian Men's Hockey Champions Trophy, India won the Gold
 2016 Olympic Games held at Rio de Janeiro
 2016 Asian Champions Trophy, India won the Gold, and he won the "Top Goal Scorer of the Tournament" (11 goals) and the "Best Player of the Tournament" award
4-Nations Invitational Tournament, held in Melbourne, he won the "Top Goal Scorer of the Tournament" award (6 goals) 
 2017 Sultan Azlan Shah Cup, India won the Bronze
 2017 Hockey World League Finals held in Bhubaneshwar, India won the Bronze, and he won the "Fan's Choice Award"
2018 4-Nations Invitational Tournament, held in Tauranga and Hamilton, in New Zealand
2018 Commonwealth Games, held at Gold Coast, Australia
2018 Asian Games, held in Jakarta, India won the Bronze
2020 Tokyo Olympics, held in Tokyo, India won the Bronze

References

External links
Rupinder Pal Singh at Hockey India

Rupinder Pal Singh at stick2hockey.com
Rupinder Pal Singh at rabobankhockeyworldcup2014.com

Field hockey players at the 2014 Commonwealth Games
Field hockey players at the 2018 Commonwealth Games
Living people
Indian Sikhs
1990 births
Asian Games medalists in field hockey
Field hockey players at the 2014 Asian Games
Field hockey players from Punjab, India
Indian male field hockey players
Asian Games gold medalists for India
Commonwealth Games silver medallists for India
Field hockey players from Delhi
Field hockey players at the 2016 Summer Olympics
Field hockey players at the 2020 Summer Olympics
Olympic field hockey players of India
Commonwealth Games medallists in field hockey
Medalists at the 2014 Asian Games
Field hockey players at the 2018 Asian Games
Asian Games bronze medalists for India
Medalists at the 2018 Asian Games
Hockey India League players
Delhi Waveriders players
Male field hockey defenders
Olympic bronze medalists for India
Medalists at the 2020 Summer Olympics
Olympic medalists in field hockey
Amsterdamsche Hockey & Bandy Club players
Recipients of the Arjuna Award
2014 Men's Hockey World Cup players
Medallists at the 2014 Commonwealth Games